Agropolis Fondation, extended name "Montpellier Agricultural Sciences and Sustainable Development” was created in France on February 21, 2007, by the three initial founding institutions INRA, CIRAD, and Montpellier SupAgro.

It constitutes the legal frame of the thematic network for advanced research (RTRA) "Agricultural Sciences and Sustainable Development", a network of research units (further described below), selected in 2006 together with twelve other networks for advanced research in various disciplines (e.g. Paris School of Economics) by the French Ministry for Research and higher education.

The Foundation is to promote the development of scientific projects of international level (research programmes and education through research) in the field of agronomy and sustainable development in relation to both North and South issues.

Scientific frame of the network 
The network scientific priorities relate to the following global issues:
An increased demand for plants, for both food and non-food purposes
The necessary adaption of crops to climate change
The prevention of risks such as plant pests and diseases, diminishing natural resources, risks related to food safety, social risks…

The network is composed of high level scientific teams, organized in two tightly connected fields:
Plant integrative biology, in the broadest sense: genetics and genomics, plant breeding, ecophysiology; plant pests and diseases, integrated crop protection, population ecology…
Socio-technical dynamics of innovation : agri-environmental innovation, food industry innovation, social innovation and social management of innovation

The thematics involved are centering on the plant : the plant, from the gene to the whole plant; the plant in its environment; plant products and their food and non-food uses…

A network of research units
In 2007, the network is composed of 29 research units (including 19 joint research units and 10 in-house research units);

About 780 scientists are involved: 
580 scientists belonging to the three initial founding institutions (500 working in Montpellier and Avignon and 80 scientists abroad).
200 scientists from partner institutions of the joint research units (CNRS, IRD, the University of Montpellier I and II, the University of Avignon, and CIHEAM-IAMM)

Aims of the Foundation

The Foundation aims to:

increase the international openness, attractiveness and renown of the Montpellier agronomic research complex especially by attracting high level foreign scientists and by contributing to the development of international cooperation projects.
stimulate the collaboration between the research units in the network.
strengthen the offer in education through research, especially towards students from emerging and developing countries

To fulfill these aims, the foundation will support incoming high level foreign scientists, finance post-doctoral and doctoral positions,  contribute to the development of structuring technological projects (i.e. technical platforms, shared equipment…),  support thematic training sessions and scientific events of international importance, as well as various others actions (release from teaching duties, support for the setting up of international projects…).

The Foundation’s actions are to be linked to those of the Agropolis International association to allow Montpellier institutions involved in agricultural sciences as a whole (totalizing approx. 2300 scientists) to reach the same international repute as other agricultural research institutes at European (e.g. Wageningen University, with 1400 scientists) or international (e.g. the  CGIAR centers network, with 1800 scientists) level.

For example, since 2009 the foundation is part of the consortium supporting Pl@ntNet, an app for automatic plant identification through photographs.

References

Social sciences organizations
Science and technology in France
Agronomy
Sustainability organizations